Mexico sent a delegation to compete at the 1984 Summer Paralympics in Stoke Mandeville/New York. Its athletes finished twenty-fifth in the overall medal count.

Medalists

See also 
 1984 Summer Paralympics
 Mexico at the 1984 Summer Olympics

References 

Nations at the 1984 Summer Paralympics
1984
Summer Paralympics